Fàn Changjiang (6 October 1909 – 23 October 1970), born Fan Xitian (范希天), was a Chinese journalist and writer. Fan was born in Sichuan Province and educated at Peking University. Fan was persecuted during the Cultural Revolution and committed suicide in 1970.

Journalism career

Biography
Fan started his career as a journalist in 1933. He was sent to the northwest of China by Da Gong Bao as a string correspondent in 1935. At that time, he editorialized a series of news which sensationalized the public. These pieces of news were later anthologized in a book called The North Western Part of China (中國的西北角). In this book, he described the Communist Party of China (CPC), the activities of Red Army and the Long March. Besides that, Fan Changjiang showed his determination and strong animosity towards feudalism warlords, rich landowners and bad scholars in this book. Meanwhile, he concerned with the development of China's future and also sympathized those who suffered from the political turmoil.

In 1936, when the political scene became chaotic and the first Chinese civil war (1928-1937) started, he went to the Inner Mongolia for observation. In December, when the famous Xi'an Incident broke out, Fan grasped the opportunity to interview Zhou Enlai at the risk of life. Zhou was amazed by his studies and analyses when he read his journals.

Later on, he went to Shaanxi province Yan'an to have a personal conversation with Mao Zedong It paved the way for Fan's future career as a journalist. When he returned to Shanghai, he published his viewpoints on the anti-Japanese movement and it was generally accepted by the mass. At that time, he was the first journalist who reported the red terror in China.

On November 8, 1937, Fan established the Chinese Young Journalists Association (中國青年記者協會) with Yang Zao (羊棗) and Xu Maijin (徐邁進) and was elected as the chief executive officer of the association. In the same year, he cofound the International News Association (國際新聞社) with Hu Yuzhi (胡愈之) in Changsha.

In 1939, he joined the Communist Party of China and was one of the people who established Hua Shang Daily《華商報》in Hong Kong. He also took up the posts of the principal of Huangzhong Journalism College (華中新聞專科學校), chairman of Huangzhong Branch of the Xinhua News Agency and Huangzhong Post of Xinhua Daily 《新華日報》(華中報).

In July 1949, he established the All-China Journalists Association with Hu Qiaomu and many other famous journalists. He was the chief editor of the Xinhua News Agency, chairman of Jiefang Daily and People's Daily.

In 1991, Fan Changjiang Journalism Awards was established by the Chinese Journalists Association Committee in order to encourage young journalists in China.

Fan's posts and his careers
Apart from being an award-winning journalist, Fan was also considered a good leader by others. He had hold various official posts, such as:

 the principal of Huangzhong Journalism College (華中新聞專科學校) in 1939
 chairman of Huangzhong Branch of New China News Agency (新華社華中分社) in 1939
 chairman of Huangzhong Post of Xinhua Daily 《新華日報》(華中報)in 1939
 chief editor of New China News Agency (新華社) in 1949
 president of Jiefang Daily 《解放日報》and Renmin Daily 《人民日報》in 1949
 vice-chancellor of China Information Agency (新聞總署)
 vice-secretary of the State administrative council Committee of Culture and Education (政務院文化教育委員會副秘書長)
 second director of office of the State Council of the People's Republic of China (國務院第二辦公室主任)
 vice minister in charge of the Commission of Science, Technology and Industry for National Defence (國家科委副主任)

Ideology

Ideology in newspaper aspect
In the book, "Communication and essay", Fan believed that newspaper was a political tool. It was the basic principle of journalism. A journalist should not fear to discuss politics, should not tend to avoid politics. More importantly, journalist should not violate era. In addition, Fan suggested that if there were correct politics to make instructions, the news work would be an important power to accelerate the advancement of the society.

Obligation to tell the truth
Fan had a clear political and journalistic stand. When he was young, he was greatly influenced by the revolutionary movement and joined series of anti-imperialism movements. He was almost sent to death in the Chongqing Massacre. But this experience further strengthened his ideology which was to seek and report the truth. He believed that honesty should be the most important element of being a journalist.

Loyalty to the party
Fan believed that journalist should support the reforms and determine to be loyal to the party (Communist Party of China). The public should not fear danger and harshness but have incentive to learn and think. He even became a communist journalist and joined Communist Party of China after he left Da Gong Bao. He was strongly against the capitalist class and supported communism.

Loyalty to citizens
As described before, Fan wrote a series of articles disclosing the north-west rotten policy, the secret agreements and the hidden side of the red army. What he wanted to show to the people was the urgent need for revolution. He insisted that all his reports and articles should let the people know what was happening in their country.

What is journalism to Fan Changjiang
Fan claimed that a reporter who intended to write excellent journal articles, one must get himself involved in the public. He thought that journalism was the fact of what people want to know and what people should know but had not known. Fan said "This is a thought which is not very across the board, but it does penetrate a spirit to serve the public. As a reporter or journalist, we should always learn to examine the problems and issues raised up by the public and citizens which means to learn what you report. We should also learn the technique of writing by being aware of the response of the public. If the article is not related to the public, there is always no response or voice. Public is considered as the source of journalism, so newspaper should always think of ways to let reporters and journalists get connected to it."

Fan and journalism in China
As the president of the Chinese Journalists Association Committee, Fan focused on the overall development of journalism in China. He once said, "A telegraph, a letter or a news article influence the attitude of the readers towards the war. It influences the feeling of soldiers in the frontier and the morale of workers at the back." Fan emphasized that journalism played an extremely important role during war. He requested all the journalists to have respectable personality, important sense of responsibility and outstanding quality in news reporting. Fan also pointed out the importance of strengthening self-education as well as the promotion of noble-quality with combinations of present political, social and journalistic environment for young journalists.

Famous journals of Fan
After his journey to Xi'an and Yan'an, he was employed by Da Gong Bao as a reporter. At that period of time, he wrote a lot of articles such as 
 Cong Jia Yu Shuo Dao Shan Hai Guan ( From Jia Yu to Shan Hai Guan《從嘉峪說到山海關》 )
 Bai ling Miao Zhan Hou Hang (The War in Bai Ling Miao 《百靈廟戰後行》)
 Yi Xi Meng《憶西蒙》
On 7 July 1937, the Marco Polo Bridge Incident broke out. Fan went there to investigate the event. He went to Lugouqiao, Cheng Xin Dian, etc. Fan wrote plenty of Battlefield communications including 
 Beside the Lugouqiao《盧溝橋畔》
 Xi Xian Feng Yun《西線風雲》
 Shiue Bo Ping Jin《血泊平津》
After China Young Journalists Association was founded, Fan went to Jin Pu Lu (津浦路), where the Second Sino-Japanese War was the most fiercest, to report the event. He wrote a lot of communications to reveal the war situation and front tactical situation in Tai Er Zhuang(台兒莊). Those communications were compiled and printed as "Xuzhou Breaks Through"(徐州突圍).

China Young Journalists Association
It was established by Fan and other journalists at Shanghai in 1937. The aim of this association was to unite all journalists at that time and to spread the message of protecting China against the Japanese. This association later became the All-China Journalists Association. The day of its establishment, November 8, has been proclaimed by the Central government and the Communist Party of China as "Journalists' day" (記者節) since 2000. This day serves as a reminder to Chinese people of the devotion and dedication of the former journalists.

International News Association
During the Sino-Japanese War, Fan Changjiang, Hu Yuzhi and other journalists founded the International News Association at Changsha in 1936. Fan was the president of this association at that time. It was a left-leaning press agency during the period that China was still under the ruling of Kuomintang. It had a legal news gathering and the right of reporting to release the news and reviews of the Sino-Japanese War to the newspaper publishers in mainland China and the rest of the world, especially the news of the Communist Party of China, the Eighth Route Army and the New Fourth Army.

Fan Changjiang Journalism Award
The Fan Changjiang Journalism Award is one of the three national journalists awards (the other two are the Taofen Journalism Award and Top 100 Journalists) issued by the All-China Journalists Association (ACJA). This is a prize for middle-aged and young journalists. It is named after Fan for his bold and objective coverage of the Chinese Revolution led by the Communist Party of China against the Kuomintang regime. The award started in 1991. Since 2000, the award is issued by the ACJA every two years (with the other two awards simultaneously). In the first three Fan Changjiang Journalism Awards, 10 reporters would receive the award and 30 reporters would receive the nominated award each time. But the nominated awards were cancelled starting from the fourth Awards. The nominee should age below 50 and work in the field of formal journals, public newspapers, national press agency, authorized radio stations, television stations and other news agency, with a minimum of 10-years successive reporter experience.

Fan and literature in China
Fan Changjiang is considered as one of the most prominent journalists in Chinese history. He had written a huge number of outstanding news articles and taken up a lot of leading positions in this field. His style of writing are considered as very modern, righteous and vivid.

"Sai Shang Xing"
"Sai Shang Xing" (塞上行) is a book written by Fan Changjiang in 1937. The Xi'an Incident was a turning point in Chinese political history. At that time, Fan's journey to Xi'an and Yan'an as a reporter had changed his political standpoint from a patriotic [journalist to a communist who fought for the proletariat. The release of his book The Journey to Northern Shaanxi (陝北之行) facilitated the understanding of Chinese citizens from different classes about the Communist Party of China and Red Army. It also spread out the idea of unity of the nation against Japan. It was the first time Fan got direct contact with the party and his mind got changed after talking to Mao Zedong overnight. Later, Mao even wrote two letters to Fan answering his questions concerning the topic about the unity of the nation against Japan. Mao also affirmed Fan's news article on Xiabei. Sai Shang Xing is a book and a record of Fan's change of his mind.

"The Northwestern Part of China"
This book revealed the rotten policy in the north-west side. It also showed the hidden side of the red army and exposed all the secret agreements made among the leaders at that time. Fan definitely told people the truth. He wasn't afraid of the pressures from the government and reported it in the book to express his concerns on the country. Hu Yuzhi commented that “it is an excellent work which shocks all the Chinese.”

"Communication and Essay"
In this book, Fan described the use of communications and essays clearly which not only gave a format and spirit to the youth journalists for reporting, but also for the writers have the sense of persuasive communication.

"Collection of Fan Changjiang's News Articles"
"Collection of Fan Changjiang's News Article" was published in 1989. It contains some parts of the news articles written by Fan without editing. It focuses and respects on the original face of those records, just like Fan said in the preface that "Journalists must respect history, must respect the reality".

Fan and the Xi'an Incident in China
On December 12, 1936, Xi'an Incident broke out in China during the invasion of Japan and nationalist-communist confrontation (1927-1936), which had great effects on political and military aspects. Fan Changjiang, as a reporter, headed to Xi'an in order to unveil the situation to the public. He said, 'I determined to go to Xian to unveil the truth of China's politics at all costs.' He gained the insight into the current affairs. Fan went there alone to find out the mysteries of Xi'an Incident.

Fan was finally permitted to interview the first premier of China, Zhou Enlai on February 4, 1937. Zhou told him all the details about Xi'an Incident, such as the reasons of the incident, the ideas of the Communist party and the important issues about defensing the country against Japan. All these information had made Fan's articles even more accurate and in-depth.

Later, with the permission of Zhou Enlai, he went to Yan'an with great welcome for further details or even investigation. In Yan'an, he visited the
" Red Army University" (紅軍大學) and interviewed some senior and important officers in the Communist party of China, for example, Lin Biao, Liao Chengzhi and Zhu De, especially the first chairman of People's Republic of China, Mao Zedong on February 9.

Fan told Mao that he wanted to stay in northern Shaanxi; in order to get more information about Communist Party of China, so that he could write a few book on them to propagate the party. However, Mao pointed out that the most important thing was to utilize the important position of Da Gong Bao in the public to propagate the ideas and policies of Communist Party of China, so the co-operation between the Communist party and Kuomintang could be facilitated.

After returning to Shanghai, Fan wrote the news article Turmoil in the Northwest (動盪中之西北大局) on the Ta Kung Pao on February 16. This article finally shocked the public and embarrassed Chiang Kai-shek, the leader of Nationalist Government by unveiling the truth in Xi'an. Mao was glad after reading his article and even wrote a letter to Fan to appreciate his efforts.

Fan had written a lot of exclusive articles about Red Army March and Xi'an Incident, which acted as a forwarding power to the Chinese history. He was an initial reporter writing about the details of Red Army March in his two articles called Minshan Nanbei Jiaofei Zhi Xianshi 《岷山南北剿匪軍事之現勢》and Chenglan Jixing 《成蘭紀行》.

Timeline
 1909 October 6 – Fan was born in Sichuan province.
 1927 August 1 – Fan participated in the Nanchang Uprising.
 1928 spring – Fan entered the Nanjing Central Party Affair School(南京中央黨務學校) which later called Central School of Politics (中央政治學校)--(1)
 1931 September – Fan quit the school as it suppressed Fan's effort to lead the students to fight against Japan’s invasion, after the Mukden Incident on September 18. He also quit Kuomintang.
 1932 – Fan started studying philosophy in Peking University.
 1933 – He started writing articles in several newspapers, such as Chen Bao (《晨報》)in Beijing,Shi Jie Ri Bao (《世界日報》)and Yi Shi Bao (《益世報》)in Tianjin.
 1934 – Fan was hired by Tianjin's Da Gong Bao.
 1935 May – Fan, as a commissioner of Da Gong Bao, visited the northwest part of China for 10 months. He wrote a series of articles and later were collected and published in The North Western Part of China.
 1937 – Fan went to Xi'an in early February in an attempt to unveil the situation there after the Xian incident. The articles were later collected in The Journey to Shanbei《陝北之行》.
- February 4 – Fan met Zhou Enlai in Xian

- February 9 – Fan met Mao Zedong in Shaanxi

- February 15 – Da Kung Bao published Fan's famous article: Dongdangzhong Zhi Xibei Daju 《動盪中之西北大局》

- November 8 – Fan established the Chinese Young Journalists Association (中國青年新聞記者協會) with his Colleagues.
 1938 March 30 – Chinese Young Journalists Association (中國青年新聞記者協會) was renamed as Chinese Young Journalists Society (中國青年新聞記者學會) and Fan was appointed as the society representative.
 1939 May – Fan joined the Communist party. and cofound the Huashang Daily 《華商報》 in Hong Kong. His posts included the principal of Huangzhong Journalism College (華中新聞專學校), chairman of Huangzhong Branch of New China News Agency (新華社華中分社) and Huangzhong Post of Xinhua Daily 《新華日報》(華中報).
 1940 December 8 – Fan married Shen Junru's daughter, Shen Pu in Chongqing.
 1949 July – Establishment of the All-China Journalists Association.
 1967 – Fan was forced to solitary confinement since the Cultural Revolution started.
 1970 October 23 – Fan committed suicide by jumping into a well in Henan Province when he was 61 years old.
 1978 December 27 – Fan was redressed by the Central Government.
 1991 – Fan Changjiang Journalism Awards was set up by the Chinese Journalists Association Committee and served as an encouragement of the young journalists in China.

• (1): All students were obliged to join Kuomintang at that time.

See also
Zou Taofen

External links
 Fan Changjiang's biography (in traditional Chinese)
 The Youth Of Fan Changjiang (in traditional Chinese)
 Fan Changjiang's 31st Death Anniversary (in traditional Chinese)
 Fan Changjiang's tragedy (in traditional Chinese)
 Introduction To Fan Changjiang Journalism Awards (in traditional Chinese) 
 Deng Xiaoping Thought
 All-China Journalists Association

Peking University alumni
Suicides during the Cultural Revolution
1909 births
1970 suicides
Republic of China journalists
People's Republic of China journalists
Chinese war correspondents
Writers from Neijiang
People's Daily people
1970 deaths